Ji Ru was a trusted personal servant of Emperor Gaozu, the founder of China's Han Dynasty.  Louis Crompton claims that Ji Ru was Gaozu's pillow companion, or homosexual lover, and that Ji Ru had more access to the emperor than did ministers.  Ji Ru was documented by Sima Qian in the Records of the Grand Historian:

Gaozu's example of officially elevating a male lover to the top of the administration would be followed by nine more rulers of the Han Dynasty. This relationship was especially noted because Gaozu was a former brigand with coarse manners, while Ji Ru was considered elegant.

References

2nd-century BC Chinese people
Ancient LGBT people
Chinese LGBT people
Male lovers of royalty